Aral (ارال اۋدانى) is a district of Kyzylorda Region in southern Kazakhstan. The administrative center of the district is the town of Aral. Population:

Geography

References

Further reading
 Bissell, Tom. (2003). Chasing the Sea: Lost Among the Ghosts of Empire in Central Asia. Pantheon Books, New York. .

Districts of Kazakhstan
Kyzylorda Region